"Swinging Doors" is a song written and recorded by American country music artist Merle Haggard and The Strangers.  It was released in February 1966 as the first single and title track from the album Swinging Doors.  The song peaked at number five on the U.S. Billboard Hot Country Singles.

Content
The narrator has been dumped by his woman and tells her that he has what he needs.

Chart performance

Cover versions 
 Wanda Jackson covered this song on her 1968 album  Cream of the Crop .

 Mickey Gilley released this song in 1974 as a B-side to his number 1 hit I Overlooked an Orchid.
 Del Reeves released it in 1981 and peaked at number 67 in the country charts.
Ray Price
 Faron Young
 Johnny Paycheck Released this song in July 1966
  Willie Nelson and Merle Haggard on their duet album  Django & Jimmie .
Terri Clark on her 2012 album Classic.
Buck Owens
George Jones
Mark Chesnutt
Agent 51

References

1966 songs
Merle Haggard songs
Wanda Jackson songs
Mickey Gilley songs
Del Reeves songs
Terri Clark songs
Songs written by Merle Haggard
Song recordings produced by Ken Nelson (American record producer)
Capitol Records singles
1966 singles